Jean-Marie Binetruy (born 17 July 1946) is a French politician who served as the member of the National Assembly for the fifth constituency of Doubs from 2002 to 2012. A member of the Rally for the Republic (RPR) until 2002, he then joined the newly-established Union for a Popular Movement (UMP) before it became The Republicans (LR) in 2015.

Career
A native of Villers-le-Lac, Binetruy is a teacher by occupation. Prior to his tenure as a parliamentarian, he was elected Mayor of Morteau in 1995 and reelected in 2001. He then served two terms in the National Assembly upon his election in 2002 and reelection in 2007. He remained a municipal councillor in Morteau until 2020.

References

1946 births
Living people
People from Doubs
Politicians from Bourgogne-Franche-Comté
Rally for the Republic politicians
Union for a Popular Movement politicians
The Republicans (France) politicians
Deputies of the 12th National Assembly of the French Fifth Republic
Deputies of the 13th National Assembly of the French Fifth Republic